The Battle of James Island (also known as the Skirmish at James Island) was a minor skirmish near the end of the American Civil War. It was known as the "Last fight for Charleston".

Background
Since the fall of Morris Island in 1863 no major offensive had been carried out against Charleston. Several small skirmishes and expeditions were carried out against James Island and Johns Island. On February 10, 1865, Union troops from the Northern District of the Department of the South under Brigadier General Alexander Schimmelfennig made one final expedition to James Island. Confederate Major Edward Manigault of the South Carolina Siege Train (Manigault's Battalion) commanded a small force manning rifle pits on the southern edge of James Island at Grimball's Causeway.

Battle
Early on the morning of February 10, four Union gunboats shelled the Confederate rifle pits while General Schimmelfennig's troops began their landing. The 144th New York Infantry led the main attack against the center of the Confederate line along the causeway. At the same time the 54th New York Infantry made a charge against the right flank of the Confederate line. Manigault detached a small force from the 2nd South Carolina Artillery along the causeway to reinforce the right. The attack of the 144th New York began to falter but the flank attack succeeded and the Confederates began to give way. Major Manigault was severely wounded and taken prisoner during the fighting. The official records reported that his leg required amputation and he died as a result, although in fact the major survived. The Union forces occupied the Confederate rifle pits following the skirmish.

Aftermath
The battle proved to be inconclusive when both sides eventually withdrew after making no significant gains. As Union General William T. Sherman’s army moved through South Carolina, the Confederate forces evacuated Charleston. Then on February 18, Schimmelfennig accepted the city's surrender from the mayor.

Forces
Union
1st Separate Brigade: Brigadier General Alexander Schimmelfennig
54th New York Infantry: Colonel Eugene Kolzay
144th New York Infantry: Colonel James Lewis
32nd U.S. Colored Infantry: Colonel George W. Baird
33rd U.S. Colored Infantry (1st South Carolina Infantry): Colonel Thomas Wentworth Higginson
55th Massachusetts Colored Infantry: Colonel Alfred S. Hartwell

Confederate
2nd South Carolina Heavy Artillery: Major Edward Manigault
Palmetto Guard: Captain Benjamin C. Webb
1st South Carolina Cavalry, dismounted detachment: Lieutenant William G. Roberts

See also
 Charleston, South Carolina in the American Civil War
 Battle of James Island (1862), a.k.a. Battle of Secessionville
 Battle of Grimball's Landing

References

Further reading
 Bostick, Douglas W. Charleston Under Siege: The Impregnable City (2010)
 Coffey, Walter. The Civil War Months: A Month-By-Month Compendium of the War Between the States (2012)
 Sutherland, Jonathan. African Americans at War: An Encyclopedia, Volume 1 (2004)

1865 in South Carolina
Battles of the American Civil War in South Carolina
Campaign of the Carolinas
February 1865 events